The Taifa of Santarém was a medieval Islamic taifa Moorish kingdom in what is now central Portugal. It existed from 1144 to 1145. It was centered in the city of Santarém and encompassed much of the present day Santarém District. The Taifa was ruled by the Arab tribe of Banu Khazraj which had its origin in the Hejaz region of Arabia.

List of Emirs

Labidid dynasty
 Labid: 1144–1145
 To Badajoz: c. 1145–1147

1145 disestablishments
States and territories established in 1144
Santarem
12th century in Portugal
Taifas in Portugal